Chlorisondamine is a nicotinic acetylcholine receptor antagonist that produces both neuronal and ganglionic blockade.

Chlorisondamine has been shown to form noncovalent complexes with various biomolecules including sphingomyelin and other associated glycolipids.

References 

Nicotinic antagonists
Quaternary ammonium compounds
Chloroarenes